KCGC 94.5 FM is a radio station licensed to Merino, Colorado. The station broadcasts a country music format and is owned by Northeast Colorado Broadcasting, LLC.

Previous logo

References

External links
KCGC's official website

CGC
Country radio stations in the United States